The 2014–15 season was Feyenoord's 107th season of play, it marked its 59th season in the Eredivisie and its 93rd consecutive season in the top flight of Dutch football. It was first season with manager Fred Rutten. The club was busy during the summer transfer window, selling or releasing of 12 players and signing 13 new players. Feyenoord had a bad start of the season, dropping to 15th place in the league after losing three and drawing two of its first six league games. They played only the second round of the KNVB Cup; they were knocked out by Go Ahead Eagles. The club also lasted a single round in the Champions League; the third qualifying round consisted of two losses to Beşiktaş. They reached the Europa League group stage by beating FC Zorya Luhansk 4–3 at home after an away draw. The team improved after this early showing. A five-game winning streak catapulted them to third place in the Eredivisie by mid fall. They also reached the knockout phase of the Europa League by beating Standard Liège, HNK Rijeka and title holders Sevilla in the group phase. They went into the winter break placed third in the league.

The club started in mediocre form after the winter break, winning three out of six games, while remaining in third place. Their round of 32 match-up in the Europa League against A.S. Roma marked the end of their European campaign; they lost 2–3 on aggregate. This started off a strong showing in the Eredivisie in which they won five out of six games, solidifying their third position in the league. Their season turned sour after this; they only collected two points in the final five games of the season. This skid landed them in fourth place at the end of the season. They lost their play-off match-up with SC Heerenveen for the last remaining European ticket, which means they will only play domestically in the 2015–16 season.

Background
Feyenoord is one of the Big Three football clubs in the Netherlands having played at the highest level of competition uninterrupted since 1921. The previous three seasons the club was coached by Ronald Koeman; he announced his intention to leave the club in February 2014. During these three seasons Feyenoord finished second, third and second in the league, they got ousted from the cup twice in the quarter-finals and once in the third round. Their European campaigns were short-lived with five losses and one draw during these three years. A month after Koeman's announcement, Fred Rutten was presented as the new manager.

The club started their 2013–14 season with three straight league losses and an immediate exit from European football. They got knocked out of the cup in the quarter finals. The team managed to come back from their early 17th league position and climbed to fourth place by the halfway point. They stayed in this position for most of the second half of the season and went on a winning streak to finish the 2013–14 Eredivisie in second place. This position gave the club an entry berth in the 2014–15 UEFA Champions League. Five Feyenoord players from this season were selected for the Dutch squad for the 2014 FIFA World Cup – Feyenoord contributed the most players to the Dutch team. Nine out of all World Cup players were trained by Feyenoord; they were the club that contributed most worldwide to develop players for this event.

Review and events

Pre-season
Feyenoord started the pre-season preparations with its first training session on 25 June 2014 in front of 5,000 fans. They beat amateur sides SV Honselersdijk, VOC, FC Horst and ASWH in pre-season friendlies. Graziano Pellè, the top goals scorer of the two previous seasons, transferred to Southampton F.C., managed by Ronald Koeman who coached Feyenoord the previous three seasons, for eight million euros. The club announced they had acquired former international defender Khalid Boulahrouz transfer-free several days later. On 15 July the transfer of Daryl Janmaat to Newcastle United F.C. and Bruno Martins Indi to F.C. Porto was announced, both played as defensive backs the previous season and were bronze medalists in the Dutch squad at the 2014 FIFA World Cup. The club subsequently played a friendly game away at FC Emmen that resulted in a 2–0 win. They were supposed to play Fortuna Sittard in Echt-Susteren on 19 July, that game got banned in that municipality and was played behind closed doors in Rotterdam, resulting in a Feyenoord win. The last pre-season friendly ended in a 1–1 draw at home against Spanish side Real Sociedad; Mitchell te Vrede scored the lone Feyenoord goal. Before the game, a moment of silence commenced to remember the victims of Malaysia Airlines Flight 17. Stefan de Vrij, the best defender of the 2010 FIFA World Cup, was transferred to S.S. Lazio at the end of July, marking the fourth high-profile sale of a Feyenoord player this transfer window.

Summer
Feyenoord's second place in the previous season qualified them for the third qualifying round of the 2014–15 Champions League. They were drawn against Beşiktaş J.K., who finished third in the 2013–14 Süper Lig. Feyenoord lost the first leg of the two-legged tie 1–2 at home on 30 July; Te Vrede converted a stoppage time penalty kick for the single Feyenoord goal. The club obtained two new players the next day, although they cannot play yet in the return against Beşiktaş. Luke Wilkshire came from FC Dynamo Moscow without transfer fee and Bilal Başaçikoğlu was obtained from SC Heerenveen for three and a half million euros.

The club played their return against Beşiktaş on 6 August without their new players and lost 3–1 in Istanbul, after Manu equalized the game with 16 minutes left to play. This loss knocked them out of the Champions league and into the play-off round of the 2014–15 Europa League, in which they were drawn against Ukrainian side FC Zorya Luhansk. Feyenoord opened their league campaign on the road against ADO Den Haag, they won this game 1–0 after a stoppage time goal by Te Vrede. On 15 August, Feyenoord announced they loaned forward Colin Kazim-Richards from Bursaspor for one season; the player did not yet play that evening when Feyenoord faced Heerenveen at home. This game saw two goals in three minutes, one by each team, and ended as a 1–1 draw after Te Vrede's equalizer levelled the score in the second half. Feyenoord's away game against Zorya Luhansk was played in Kyiv on 21 August, both teams scored in the first half; Luhansk got the first goal and Te Vrede equalized ten minutes later. The second half remained scoreless, the game ended in a one-all draw. The following Sunday, Feyenoord last their first game, it ended as 1–2 at home against FC Utrecht despite a first half lead from a Te Vrede goal. The next day Feyenoord announced they acquired midfielder Jens Toornstra from FC Utrecht for four years; he did not play against Feyenoord on his last day at FC Utrecht. Feyenoord secured their first European group stage appearance since 2008 on 28 August in a seven-goal home game against Luhansk. Feyenoord went up 2–0 at half time after goals by Te Vrede and Schaken. A Luhansk own goal led them to a comfortable 3–0 lead before conceding three successive goals brought them on the verge of elimination. Manu scored two minutes into stoppage time to give Feyenoord the 4–3 game win and 5–4 aggregate score that qualified them for the group stage of the Europa League. The next day the groups stage draw was held, placing Feyenoord with the Spanish title holder Sevilla FC, Belgian side Standard Liège and Croatian HNK Rijeka. On 31 August, Feyenoord sold midfielder Ruud Vormer to Club Brugge. Feyenoord ended August on the 31st with a scoreless away draw at FC Twente.

The club bought midfielder Karim El Ahmadi back from Aston Villa F.C. on 1 September, El Ahmadi played four seasons for Feyenoord before transferring to Aston Villa in 2012. Feyenoord acquired goalkeeper Kenneth Vermeer the same day from arch rival Ajax; Vermeer obtained four caps in the Dutch national team prior to his arrival at Feyenoord. After an international break, Feyenoord played Willem II at home. Despite a late Kazim-Richards goal, Feyenoord lost 2–1, which led to a season-worst 14th position with five points from five games. Feyenoord opened their Europa League group stage with an away game against Sevilla FC on 18 September. The game resulted in a 2–0 loss with both goals coming from set pieces in the first half.

Fall
Feyenoord played De Klassieker at home on 21 September. They lost the game 1–0 after an early goal and dropped to the 15th position in the league table with 5 points from 6 matches. The club was knocked out of the 2014–15 KNVB Cup in the second round by Go Ahead Eagles the following Wednesday. They played the Eagles again in Deventer three days later, this time for a league match. They avenged their early cup exit by winning 4–0 with two goals a half; one was an Eagles own goal, Toornstra, Kazim-Richards and Te Vrede scored one each to reach this score line.

They played their second Europa League group game on 2 October against Standard Liège. Feyenoord scored first with a header of Van Beek shortly after half time. Standard equalized halfway through the second half before Manu's deciding goal shortly before the end of the game gave Feyenoord a 2–1 win. They had a second straight 4–0 league win, this time at home against FC Groningen, the following Sunday with goals by four different players. Feyenoord climbed to the top half of the table on 18 October when they beat Heracles Almelo 2–1 at home after two goals by Manu. They played Rijeka away in the Europa League on 23 October, a game they lost 3–1, with all goals coming after half time. This placed them last in the group, two points from the leaders, at the half-way mark of the group matches. Feyenoord climbed to third place in the league table on 26 October with their fourth straight league win. They beat SC Cambuur 1–0 on the road with a first half Toornstra goal.

Feyenoord beat KNVB Cup holders PEC Zwolle, who had the same number of points going into the game, 2–0 at home on 1 November after second-half goals by both Van Beek and Boëtius. The following Thursday, Feyenoord played Rijeka at home. They arrived at the final 2–0 score quickly after an eight-minute goal by El Ahmadi and a 20th-minute header by Immers. The win led the club to the second place in the group with two matches left to play. Feyenoord played away at Vitesse Arnhem on 9 November, a game that ended in a scoreless draw. They played FC Dordrecht at home on 22 November. The game remained scoreless until deep in the second half when Toornstra and Schaken both scored to claim a 2–0 victory. They played their fifth Europa League group match at home against title holder Sevilla on 27 November. No goals were scored in the first half; 10 minutes into the second half Toornstra scored to give Feyenoord the lead, El Ahmadi doubled the score line shortly before full-time. The 2–0 win put them in first place in the group and secured their position in the knockout phase of the tournament.

Feyenoord played an away derby against Excelsior on 6 December. They won 5–2 after a pair of goals from Immers and additional scores by Kazim-Richards, Boëtius and Toornstra; Van Beek scored an own goal to add to Excelsior's total. They clinched first place in their Europa League group on 11 December by winning 3–0 in Liège against Standard, the win ended a ten-game drought without a win in European away games. Toornstra opened the score in the first half with a free kick; after half time Boëtius and Manu added to the score. They ended group play with four wins and two losses. As group winners they were seeded in the draw for the knockout phase. Sunday 14 December the club played AZ at home, Feyenoord outplayed AZ in the first half, but conceded two. They fought their way to a two-all draw in the second half with an early goal by Kazim-Richards and a stoppage time strike by Clasie. The next day, the round of 32 fixtures were drawn for the Europa League; Feyenoord was matched to Italian side A.S. Roma, Serie A runners-up in 2013–14. On 17 December Feyenoord played away against PSV; they lost the game 4–3 despite goals by Manu, El Ahmadi and Kazim-Richards.

Winter
Feyenoord played their last game of 2014 away at NAC Breda, a game they won due to a lone goal by Kazim-Richards in the first half. The winter break started after this game; Feyenoord had won nine out of 17 games, while drawing four and losing four, to claim third place at the halfway mark, 12 points behind the league leaders. The last day of the year the club announced they loaned Matthew Steenvoorden to FC Dordrecht for the rest of the season.

Several days into 2015, Ruben Schaken left the club before signing at Inter Baku. The club then went on a winter training camp in Dubai to prepare for the second half of the season. Feyenoord resumed play after the winter break with a home game against FC Twente on 18 January. Feyenoord won the game by a 3–1 margin after a first half goal by Immers and second half goals by Toornstra and Boëtius. The next Sunday, Feyenoord played De Klassieker away. The game ended in a scoreless draw, the first since 1978.

Feyenoord hosted ADO Den Haag on 1 February, a game that ended in a 2–1 win for Feyenoord with both goals coming in the first half. Feyenoord lost the following Wednesday 3–1 away at SC Heerenveen, despite Kazim-Richards scoring the first goal of the match. They got all three points the next Sunday after beating SC Cambuur 2–1 at home 8 February due to El Ahmadi and Kazim-Richards goals just before and just after half time. Feyenoord dropped their second game of February the following Sunday with a 2–0 loss away at Heracles Almelo. Feyenoord played A.S. Roma in Rome on 19 February in the first leg of their round of 32 Europa League match-up. The game ended in a one-all draw, with Kazim-Richards scoring in the second half for Feyenoord. The following Sunday, they hosted Excelsior, also from Rotterdam, in De Kuip. Although they conceded twice before half time, Kazim-Richards, Toornstra and Immers scored after the break to give Feyenoord a 3–2 win.

Feyenoord played on 1 March; the game ended as a scoreless away draw against FC Utrecht. The lost point saw them drop to fourth place in the league standings. They regained the third league position the following week with a 3–0 home win over NAC Breda when Immers scored one and Te Vrede two goals. Feyenoord played their last game of the winter on 15 March away at FC Dordrecht. They won 2–1 because, with Achahbar scoring the winning goal in second half stoppage time.

Spring
Feyenoord took their winning streak into the spring. The team won their third straight game on 22 March at home against PSV by a 2–1 margin after two Achahbar goals two minutes apart.

Feyenoord further solidified their third position on 5 April when they visited fourth-placed AZ and beat them 4–1. Both teams got an own goal in the game, with Achabar (once) and Manu (twice) scoring in the right goal for Feyenoord. The following Sunday the club visited Willem II and drew the game 2–2 after goals by Manu and Kazim-Richards. On 19 April, Feyenoord hosted Go Ahead Eagles in their penultimate home game of the season. They lost 0–1 after conceding in the second half. Feyenoord played away at FC Groningen on 26 April; Clasie's first half goal led to a one-all draw.

Feyenoord played their penultimate league game of the season at home against Vitesse Arnhem on 11 May. They lost 4–1, keeping them in third position on goal differential going into the last matchday. Feyenoord lost their last league game of the season on 17 May away at PEC Zwolle 3–0. Feyenoord dropped to fourth place in the final standings, qualifying them for play-off games to clinch the last Dutch berth for the Europa League. They lost their semi-final game 3–2 on aggregate in the extra time of the second half against SC Heerenveen, which means they will not play European football in the 2015–16 season.

Competitions

Overall

Last updated: End of season. Source: Competitions

Eredivisie

League table

Results summary

League matches

Source: Royal Dutch Football Association

European competition play-offs
Four teams play for a spot in the 2015–16 UEFA Europa League third qualifying round.

KNVB Cup

Champions League

Third qualifying round

Europa League

Play-off round

Group stage

Group G table

Group matches

Knockout phase

Round of 32

Friendlies

Player details

|}
Sources: Squad numbers, Eredivisie stats, Champions League statistics, Europa League statistics

Transfers

In

Out

Loans in

Loans out

Club

Coaching staff

Kit

|
|
|
|
|
|
|

Feyenoord signed a four-year sponsorship contract with Opel in 2013. Opel will be the main sponsor, and appear on the kit, for the second consecutive season and the seventh season overall for the 2014–15 campaign. In September 2013, the club announced Adidas would return as kit supplier for Feyenoord for five years starting July 2014.

References

Feyenoord seasons
Feyenoord
Feyenoord
Feyenoord